Ivory Homes is an American housing construction company, active mainly in Utah. In 2017 it was in 60th place on a list of such companies by size in the United States.

History

As Utah started to face the economic issue of limited housing affordability and a significant housing gap, in 2017 the firm initiated a program, Ivory Innovations, offering competitions and prizes for innovative ideas on making housing more affordable.

Controversy
In December 2013, the Applewood Park mobile home complex announced rent increases for their property totaling 44 percent over a six-month period. Applewood Park was purchased in 2011 by a company affiliated with Ivory Homes, ICO Multifamily Holdings. Residents, suspect the rent increases are designed to force them to abandon their homes and allow ICO to replace the neighborhood with a 186-unit apartment complex.

In 2018, Ivory Homes partnered with Woodbury Corporation in proposing a project for the vacant former Cottonwood Mall Site. This proposal was a mixed-use project with high-rise apartments, single-family homes, and, commercial use  It was approved by the Holladay City Council, but later challenged by a group of local residents because of its high density. The proposal was placed on the residential mid-term election ballot; the residents voted against the project and the Supreme Court ultimately ruled in opposition to the proposal.

References

External links 
 ivoryhomes.com

Companies based in Salt Lake City
1964 establishments in Utah